Assens may refer to:

 Assens, Denmark
 Assens Municipality
 Assens, Switzerland
 Rafael Cansinos-Asséns (1882–1964), a Spanish poet, essayist, literary critic

See also
 Asse (disambiguation)
 Assen (disambiguation)

sv:Assens